CSP Izmailovo, formerly ShVSM Izmailovo, was a women's association football club based in Moscow, Russia. Founded in 2006, they began play in 2007 but folded in June 2014 during the Russian Women's Football Championship season.

The team was coached by Sergey Lavrentyev from February 2011 until October 2012, when he took the job as Russia women's national football team coach.

References

See also
 SKIF-CSP Izmailovo (women's water polo team)

Izmailovo
Izmailovo
Izmailovo
Izmailovo
Izmailovo
Izmailovo
Izmailovo